Margit (Erzsébet) Szilágyi (b. ? - d. 1504)  was a Hungarian noblewoman from the  House of Szilágyi, she was the wife of Máté (Mátyus) Maróti, Ban de Macsó, also Ispán of Bács, Baranya, Bodrog, Syrmia, Tolna and Valkó Counties. Margit (Erzsébet) Szilágyi was the daughter-in-law of László Maróti, Ban de Macsó and Erzsébet Schaunberg

References 

Margit
Hungarian nobility
15th-century Hungarian women
15th-century Hungarian nobility
16th-century Hungarian women
16th-century Hungarian nobility
Medieval Hungarian nobility